Alpha-1-syntrophin is a protein that in humans is encoded by the SNTA1 gene. Alpha-1 syntrophin is a signal transducing adaptor protein and serves as a scaffold for various signaling molecules. Alpha-1 syntrophin contains a PDZ domain, two Pleckstrin homology domain and a 'syntrophin unique' domain.

Function 

Dystrophin is a large, rod-like cytoskeletal protein found at the inner surface of muscle fibers. Dystrophin is missing in Duchenne Muscular Dystrophy patients and is present in reduced amounts in Becker Muscular Dystrophy patients. The protein encoded by this gene is a peripheral membrane protein found associated with dystrophin and dystrophin-related proteins. This gene is a member of the syntrophin gene family, which contains at least two other structurally related genes. The PDZ domain of syntrophin-α1(SNTA1), the most abundant isoform in the heart, has been reported to bind to the C-terminal domain of murine cardiac voltage-gated sodium channels (SkM2) causing altering ion channel activity leading to Long QT syndrome.

Interactions 

Syntrophin, alpha 1 has been shown to interact with Dystrophin, Nav1.1 and Nav1.5, and Aquaporin 4.

References

Further reading